Edward Clifton Cifers (July 18, 1916 – July 19, 2005) was an American football end in the National Football League (NFL) for the Washington Redskins and Chicago Bears.  He played college football at the University of Tennessee and was drafted in the sixth round of the 1941 NFL Draft.

Early life
Attended Dobyns-Bennett High School in Kingsport, Tennessee, where he was the first All-state high school football selection from NE Tennessee.

College career
Cifers played college football at the University of Tennessee and was a part of three SEC championship teams for head coach Robert Neyland.

Professional career
All-Pro in 1942, led Redskins to 1942 NFL Championship.

Military career
In 1942, Cifers enlisted in the U.S. Navy and served at Norfolk Naval Base during World War II. He was also a part of the Del-Monte Pre-Flight football team.

References

External links
 
 

1916 births
2005 deaths
American football ends
Chicago Bears players
Del Monte Pre-Flight Navyators football players
Tennessee Volunteers football players
Washington Redskins players
United States Navy personnel of World War II
People from Church Hill, Tennessee
Players of American football from Tennessee
Military personnel from Tennessee